Liv Gudrun Stoveland Woie (born 12 March 1965 in Lillesand, Norway) is a Norwegian soprano and singing teacher.

Biography 
Stoveland was raised in a musical family. This brought her to a classical education as soprano at the Agder musikkonservatorium, and eventually a diploma from the Norwegian Academy of Music. She has participated in numerous productions in musical genres such as opera and church music, and has also taken up jazz.

She has recited solo concerts and has performed as soloist in works such as Handel's "Messiah", Bach's "Christmas Oratorio" and "Requiem" by Brahms. She has a large repertoire in songs and lieder, and has sung Grieg, Sibelius, R. Strauss and Hugo Wolf numerous times. In recent years she has mostly sung classical baroque music and toured with "Stabat Mater" by Vivaldi on the Amalfi Coast in Italy in autumn 2013.

Her debut album Close your eyes was released in 2009. A second album is on the way 2015.

Discography 
2009: Close Your Eyes (Ponca Jazz Records)
2016: Solitary Moon (Ponca Jazz)

References

External links 

Net-based singing lessons with Liv Stoveland

Norwegian sopranos
Norwegian women jazz singers
Norwegian Academy of Music alumni
People from Lillesand
1965 births
Living people
20th-century Norwegian women singers
20th-century Norwegian singers
21st-century Norwegian women singers
21st-century Norwegian singers